was a Swedish rock band from Stockholm, that existed from 1983 to 1988.

History
They were joined by Christian Falk (bass) and Per Hägglund (sax, keyboards). Stry left in 1984 and Gurra the following year. Gurra was replaced by Fred Asp on the drums. In 1987 Per Hägglund left and  disbanded in 1988.

's sound was inspired by punk, rock and synthpop. Their lyrics were left-wing and anti-imperialist; songs like "C. C. Cowboys", "" (Always Red, Always Right), and "" (Where’s the Wolf?) were inspired by Russian Communist poet Mayakovsky. 

Mainly successful in Sweden and Scandinavia,  also toured overseas, playing in the United States, Cuba, Central America and South America. In 1988,  released their only English language album, called . It featured translated versions of their old songs. The album had an intensive promotional European tour, but was only popular in Sweden. This put an end to plans for an international career.

Their original name  (meaning The Space Empire), was taken from the Star Wars movie The Empire Strikes Back (1980), the Swedish title being .

Personnel

Members
Christian Falk - bass, backing vocals (1983-1988; died 2014)
Joakim Thåström - lead vocals, lead guitar (1983-1988)
Per Hägglund - synthesizer, saxophone (1983-1987)
Gunnar Ljungstedt - drums (1983-1985)
Stry Terrarie - lead vocals, organ, guitar (1983-1984)
Fred Asp - drums (1985-1988)

Line-ups

Discography

Albums
1983 - 
1984 -  (Mini-LP)
1985 - 
1985 -  (Live album)
1986 - 
1988 - 
1988 - 
1988 -  (Live album/compilation)
1990 -  (Compilation)
1995 - Greatest Hits (Compilation)
2002 -  (Compilation)
2009 -  (Compilation)

Singles
1981 - "" (as Rymdimperiet)
1982 - "" (as Rymdimperiet)
1983 - "" (as Rymdimperiet)
1983 - ""
1984 - ""
1984 - ""
1985 - ""
1985 - ""
1986 - ""
1986 - ""
1986 - ""
1987 - ""
1987 - ""
1988 - "Be the President"
1988 - ""
1988 - ""

Musical groups established in 1983
Musical groups disestablished in 1988
Swedish new wave musical groups
Swedish post-punk music groups
1983 establishments in Sweden
1988 disestablishments in Sweden